The Northern Regional Negotiations Table handles treaty negotiations in the British Columbia Treaty Process for a number of First Nations located in the far north of British Columbia and the south of the Yukon Territory in Canada.

Membership
Carcross/Tagish First Nation
Champagne and Aishihik First Nations
Taku River Tlingit First Nation
Teslin Tlingit Council

Treaty Process
All of the members are based in Yukon except for the Taku River Tlingit First Nation.  Members of the Northern Regional Negotiations Table entered the British Columbia Treaty Process because some of their traditional territories lie within British Columbia's provincial boundaries.

References

First Nations organizations in British Columbia
Northern Interior of British Columbia
First Nations in Yukon